The Fort Berthold Indian Reservation is a U.S. Indian reservation in western North Dakota that is home for the federally recognized Mandan, Hidatsa, and Arikara Nation, also known as the Three Affiliated Tribes. The reservation includes lands on both sides of the Missouri River.

Created in 1870, the reservation is a small part of the lands originally reserved to the tribes by the Fort Laramie Treaty of 1851, which allocated nearly 12 million acres (49,000 km²) in North Dakota, South Dakota, Montana, Nebraska and Wyoming.

Location

The reservation is located on the Missouri River in (in descending order of reservation land) McLean, Mountrail, Dunn, McKenzie, Mercer and Ward counties. The reservation consists of 988,000 acres (4,000 km²), of which 457,837 acres (1,853 km²) are owned by Native Americans, either as individual allotments or communally by the tribe. The McLean National Wildlife Refuge lies within its boundaries.

The Four Bears Bridge, which opened in 2005 replacing the original 1955 Four Bears Bridge, provides access across Lake Sakakawea.

History

A part of the Fort Berthold Indian Reservation is Indian territory of the Three Tribes recognized in the Treaty of Fort Laramie (1851).

Created in 1870 by the U.S. government, the reservation was named after Fort Berthold, a United States Army fort located on the northern bank of the Missouri River some twenty miles downstream (southeast) from the mouth of the Little Missouri River.

The green area (529) on the map turned U.S. territory on April 12, 1870, by executive order. Area 620 and the part of area 621 south of the Missouri remained in possession of the Indians. At the same time, the narrow area north of the Missouri (up to the greenish line) became territory of the Three Tribes. Thus, the United States recognized the Indians' right to the area with their only permanent homes in Like-a-Fishhook Village. By executive order, the tribes' holdings were reduced to the light pink area (621) on July 13, 1880 (although they gained some extra land straight north of the Missouri). On December 14, 1886, the tribes agreed to cede the land outside the nearly rectangular area on both sides of the Missouri indicated with black dots and strokes.

In the late nineteenth and early twentieth centuries under the Dawes Act and related laws, the US government redistributed communal holdings of tribes, assigning lots to heads of households. The government was trying to encourage the tribal members to take up subsistence farming in the European-American style. The tribe retained some communal holdings and, since its reorganization in the 1930s, has resisted distribution of individual allotments.

The population of the reservation was 6,341 as of the 2010 census. The Tribe reported a total enrollment of 15,013 registered tribe members in March 2016. Many members live in cities because there are more job opportunities. Unemployment on the reservation was at 42%. The 2000 census reported a reservation population of 5,915 persons living on a land area of 1,318.895 sq mi (3,415.923 km²).

The creation of Garrison Dam between 1947–53 and Lake Sakakawea as water reservoir for irrigation, for flood control, and hydroelectric power generation in 1956, increased the proportion of water area on the reservation. It totals 263.778 sq mi (683.182 km²) or one-sixth of the reservation's surface area. Creation of the lake resulted in flooding of large areas of tribal lands that were devoted to farming and ranching, destroying much of the Three Affiliated Tribes’ economy.

Communities

The largest communities of the reservation are the towns of New Town and Parshall. The tribe operates 4 Bears Casino and Lodge in New Town, which was built in 1993.

Communities are:
 Four Bears Village
 Mandaree
 New Town
 Parshall
 Twin Buttes
 White Shield
 Sanish

References

External links

 Official website of the Mandan, Hidatsa, and Arikara Nation, also known as the Three Affiliated Tribes.
 Fort Berthold Reservation, North Dakota United States Census Bureau

1870 establishments in Dakota Territory
American Indian reservations in North Dakota
Geography of Dunn County, North Dakota
Geography of McKenzie County, North Dakota
Geography of McLean County, North Dakota
Geography of Mercer County, North Dakota
Geography of Mountrail County, North Dakota
Geography of Ward County, North Dakota
States and territories established in 1870
Mandan, Hidatsa, and Arikara Nation